Lubenov (masculine) or Lubenova (feminine), also transliterated as Lyubenov/Lyubenova, is a Bulgarian surname. Notable people with the surname include:

Aleksandar Lyubenov (born 1995), Bulgarian footballer
Boris Lubenov (born 1947), Bulgarian sprint canoeist
Lyubomir Lubenov (born 1980), Bulgarian footballer
Lyubomir Lyubenov (canoeist) (born 1957), Bulgarian sprint canoeist
Paisiy Lubenov, Bulgarian sprint canoeist

Bulgarian-language surnames